Milton Ncube (born 4 March 1987) is a Zimbabwean professional footballer who plays as a left-back or forward for Wellingborough Whitworth. He has represented the Zimbabwe national team internationally.

Club career
Ncube started his career with Shooting Stars in 2008, before moving to Motor Action two years later. After another two years with Motor Action, during which he won the 2010 Zimbabwe Premier Soccer League title, he departed the club to sign for Highlanders before subsequently moving to a club outside of Zimbabwe for the first time when he agreed to join Ajax Cape Town of South Africa in 2014. On 8 July 2016, he was released by Ajax Cape Town.

International career
In January 2014, coach Ian Gorowa, invited him to be a part of the Zimbabwe national team squad for the 2014 African Nations Championship. He helped the team to a fourth-place finish after being defeated by Nigeria by a goal to nil. He made seven appearances at the 2014 African Nations Championship, in total Ncube has played for Zimbabwe 11 times and scored one goal (versus Gabon).

Career statistics

Club

International

Scores and results list Zimbabwe's goal tally first, score column indicates score after each Ncube goal.

Honours
Motor Action
Zimbabwe Premier Soccer League: 2010

Highlanders
Mbada Diamonds Cup: 2013

Ajax Cape Town
MTN 8: 2015

References

External links
 

1987 births
Living people
Zimbabwean footballers
Association football forwards
Association football fullbacks
Zimbabwe international footballers
2014 African Nations Championship players
Shooting Stars F.C. (Zimbabwe) players
Motor Action F.C. players
Highlanders F.C. players
Cape Town Spurs F.C. players
How Mine F.C. players
CAPS United  players
Harare City F.C. players
Zimbabwean expatriate footballers
Expatriate soccer players in South Africa
Zimbabwean expatriate sportspeople in South Africa
Expatriate footballers in England
Zimbabwean expatriate sportspeople in England
Zimbabwe A' international footballers